Mykhailo Yevsiyovych Bukinik (1872–1947) was a Ukrainian cellist, composer, music educator and music critic of classical music.

His four concert études for the solo cello were compulsory works at the prestigious International Cello Competition in Markneukirchen in May 2005.

Biography
Bukinik was born in 1872, in Dubno in the area of Rivne, which is in today's Ukraine (about 400  km west of Kyiv). Four of his family members, including his brother Isaac (violinist, teacher, music critic) and his two daughters decided that music would be their profession. From 1885 to 1890 Bukinik attended the music school in Kharkiv, where he was also a member of the Society for Russian Music. During these five years, he studied with Alfred von Glehn (who was also the teacher of Gregor Piatigorsky) at the Moscow Conservatory. In his solo performances and concerts as a member of the orchestra, he played together with musicians such as Sergei Taneyev, Nikolai Medtner, Konstantin Igumnov, Alexander Goldenweiser, Alexander Goedicke and W. Lambowskaja. Among his fellow students were well-known musicians such as Ferruccio Busoni, Alexander Scriabin and Sergei Rachmaninoff. Bukinik finished his studies in 1895.

He then went on tour in Russia with a symphony orchestra led by Dimitri Achscharumow. After a brief stay in Berlin, Bukinik came to Saratov in 1899, where he remained until 1904 as a teacher at the Mariinsky Institute. At the same time, he met with the famous painter Victor Borisov-Musatov, who became his lifelong friend. Pavel Kuznetsov was another painter with whom Bukinik was very close. In 1901, together with Borisov-Musatov, the field doctor and writers Vladimir Stanjukowitsch, and his wife Nadezhda, he founded the so-called English Club of Saratov. In the following two years (1904–1906) Bukinik lived in Germany, France and Switzerland.

From 1906, he had many appearances in Moscow. There he was also a cello teacher at the prestigious Gnessin School of Music (now the Gnessin Institute). After the Russian Revolution in October 1917, the school was temporarily closed. From 1919 to 1922 Bukinik was a professor at the Conservatory of Kharkiv. In 1922 he emigrated to the United States, where he worked with a Ukrainian string quartet and also played in a Ukrainian musical theater. In 1944 he published his memoirs; he died in 1947.

Bukinik was the first to play Rachmaninoff's Cello Sonata in G minor in Paris. He was the author of some cello works and edited several works by Russian composers.

References
 German Wikipedia article

External links
 

Ukrainian classical cellists
20th-century classical composers
Ukrainian classical composers
Ukrainian music educators
1872 births
1947 deaths
Moscow Conservatory alumni
People from Dubno
Male classical composers
20th-century male musicians
20th-century cellists